Bydgoszcz–Toruń metropolitan area (Polish: aglomeracja bydgosko-toruńska) is the name of the bi-polar agglomeration in the middle of the Vistula river created by 2 cities: Bydgoszcz and Toruń. The distance between the built-up areas of the cities is about 30 km. They are the administrative capitals and economic center of Kuyavian-Pomeranian Voivodship.

Despite the fact that these two cities are integrating gradually, they have been in a great competition through the centuries. In September 2004 the Medical Academy in Bydgoszcz joined Toruń University as Collegium Medicum in Bydgoszcz. Although not without some controversy, this is usually considered as an important step in the integration process.

Depending on the calculation method and on what is the exact area taken into consideration, the total population varies from between about 600,000 and 800,000 inhabitants.

See also
 Metropolitan areas in Poland

Metropolitan areas of Poland
Bydgoszcz